SpoonWEP/WPA is a GUI that uses Aircrack-ng to autonomously crack WEP and WPA keys. The tool has been included with so-called "network-scrounging cards", which are Chinese USB Wi-Fi adapters that promise Internet access "for free".

See also
 BackBox
 BackTrack
 Kali linux
 Metasploit Project
 Nmap
 BackBox
 OpenVAS
 Kismet (software)
 Aircrack-ng

References

Wireless networking
Cryptanalytic software